The 2009 Estoril Superleague Formula round was the fourth round of the 2009 Superleague Formula season, with the races taking place on September 6, 2009.

Report

Qualifying
SC Corinthians (Antônio Pizzonia) took his 3rd Superleague Formula pole of the season.

Race 1
Polesitter SC Corinthians (Antônio Pizzonia) went too slowly at the start and got passed by Olympiacos CFP (Esteban Guerrieri). When the pitstops came around Liverpool F.C. (Adrián Vallés) passed the Olympiacos CFP car in the pitstops. During SC Corinthians pitstop the car left with the rear jack still attached to the car. Antônio Pizzonia managed to shake it off before getting back on track. Atlético Madrid (María de Villota) got into the side of F.C. Porto (Álvaro Parente) ending F.C. Portos race.

With 12 minutes to go Olympiacos CFP passed SC Corinthians to go into 2nd place and with 3 minutes on the clock remaining Olympiacos CFP passed Liverpool F.C. to get into 1st and get their first ever Superleague Formula win. Liverpool F.C. came 2nd and SC Corinthians finished 3rd.

Race 2

Super Final

Results

Qualifying
 In each group, the top four qualify for the quarter-finals.

Group A

Group B

Knockout stages

Grid

Race 1

Race 2

 FC Midtjylland started from the pitlane.

Super Final

Standings after the round

References

External links
 Official results from the Superleague Formula website

Estoril
Superleague Formula